Anuradha M. Annaswamy is a computer scientist noted for her research on adaptive control theory and smart grids. Since 1996, she has worked at the Massachusetts Institute of Technology. Currently, Annaswamy is a senior research scientist at the Department of Mechanical Engineering at the Massachusetts Institute of Technology, and directs the Active Adaptive Control Laboratory (a flight controls group).

Career
Annaswamy received a B.E. degree from Indian Institute of Science in 1979. Following this, she completed a Ph.D in Computer science from Yale University in 1985.

In 2014, Annaswamy was awarded a grant, valued at £1,783,855, from the National Science Foundation to lead the project "Towards resilient computational models of electricity-gas ICI", in partnership with colleagues Christopher Knittel and Ignacio Perez-Arriaga.

Annaswamy has published over 500 academic publications, receiving over 18,000 citations. She has an h-index and i10-index of 56 and 210 respectively. Annaswamy's most cited publication (with over 5,000 citations), Stable adaptive systems, offers an understanding of the global stability properties essential to designing adaptive systems.

Awards
IEEE Control Systems Society Distinguished Member (2016)
IEEE Fellow (2002) for "contributions to adaptive control theory, neural networks and active-adaptive control of combustion systems."

 2017 Fellow, International Federation of Automatic Control
 2017 Distinguished Lecturer, IEEE Control Systems Society
 2010 Best Paper Award, IEEE Control Systems Magazine
 2008 Donald Groen Julius Prize, Institute of Mechanical Engineers
 2008 Hans Fischer Fellow, Technische Universitat Munchen-Institute for Advanced Studies
 1988 George Axelby best paper award, IEEE Trans. Autom. Control

Personal life
Annaswamy is married to Mandayam Srinivasan.

Bibliography
 Stable adaptive systems. Kumpati S Narendra, and Anuradha M Annaswamy. 2012. Courier Corporation.
 A new adaptive law for robust adaptation without persistent excitation. Kumpatis Narendra and Anuradham Annaswamy. 1987. IEEE Transactions on Automatic control. 32(2):134-145.
 Response of a laminar premixed flame to flow oscillations: A kinematic model and thermoacoustic instability results. M Fleifil, Anuradha M Annaswamy, ZA Ghoneim, Ahmed F Ghoniem. 1996. Combustion and flame. 106(4):487-510.
 Adaptive control of quadrotor UAVs: A design trade study with flight evaluations. Zachary T Dydek, Anuradha M Annaswamy, Eugene Lavretsky. 2012.  IEEE Transactions on control systems technology. 21(4): 1400-1406.
Cyber-Physical-Human Systems: Fundamentals and Applications.  Sarah K., Anuradha Annaswamy, Pramod P., Francoise Lamnabhi-Lagarrigue. 2022

References

External links

Living people
Indian computer scientists
American women computer scientists
American computer scientists
Indian women computer scientists
Fellow Members of the IEEE
Year of birth missing (living people)
Yale Graduate School of Arts and Sciences alumni
Massachusetts Institute of Technology faculty
21st-century American women